Kanyanat Chetthabutr (born 24 September 1999) is a Thai footballer who plays as a forward for Women's League club BG Bundit Asia.

International goals
''Scores and results list Thailand's goal tally first.'

References

1999 births
Living people
Women's association football forwards
Kanyanat Chetthabutr
Kanyanat Chetthabutr
Kanyanat Chetthabutr
Kanyanat Chetthabutr